Domkirche St. Marien is a Roman Catholic cathedral in Sankt Georg, Hamburg, Germany, and the metropolitan cathedral of the Roman Catholic Archdiocese of Hamburg (as of 1995). It was the first new Roman Catholic church built in Hamburg since the Reformation.

History
The cathedral stands in Danziger Straße and was built between 1890 and 1893 to the designs of Arnold Güldenpfennig. The church was erected in Romanesque revival style at the instigation of Bishop Bernhard Höting of Osnabrück, then simultaneously officiating as Vicar Apostolic of the Vicariate Apostolic of the Nordic Missions of Germany, then competent for Hamburg's Catholics. 

Güldenpfennig followed the design of the double tower front of Bremen Cathedral, as requested by Bishop Höting, probably in reference to St. Ansgar, who was archbishop of the double bishopric Hamburg-Bremen. The foundation stone was laid by Bishop Höting on August 15, 1890. Work was delayed during the summer of 1892 because of an outbreak of cholera. Public life in the city came to a halt, factories remained closed, and all work was stopped at the construction site. It was some ten weeks before work could resume. The new church was consecrated on June 28, 1893.

References

Further reading
 Kamps, Gerhard (2000) Domkirche St. Marien Hamburg. Regensburg: Schnell & Steiner.  
 Archdiocese of Hamburg (2008) Der Neue Mariendom. Besucherinformation

External links

The cathedral's official website
Domgemeinde Hamburg
St. Marien, information and photographs, at St. Georg Informationen 

Hamburg Mary's Cathedral, New St.
Mary's Cathedral, New St
Buildings and structures in Hamburg-Mitte
Roman Catholic churches completed in 1893
19th-century Roman Catholic church buildings in Germany